The Act to Obliging the Government to Provide Comprehensive Support to the Oppressed Palestinian People is a plan that was passed on December 31, 2008 by the Islamic Consultative Assembly (Parliament of the Islamic Republic of Iran) in accordance to the Article 123 of the Constitution of the Islamic Republic of Iran. The Act refers to the humanitarian aid of the Iranian nation to the oppressed nation of Palestine and condemnation of the crimes of the Zionist regime against them.

Approval details 
The Act to Obliging the Government to Provide Comprehensive Support to the Oppressed Palestinian People was presented in the form of a plan in the public meeting of the parliament of Iran on Wednesday, December 31, 2008. The plan was sent to the Guardian Council for consideration the same day. Of course, its details were reviewed by the representatives the day before, Tuesday, December 30, 2008. The plan confirmed by Guardian Council on Sunday, January 4, 2009. Finally, the final text of the Act was notified to the government on Wednesday, January 14, 2009. The Act was published in the official newspapers of Iran on Saturday, January 17, 2009 and was implemented by the relevant agencies on Monday, February 2, 2009.

Content 
The Act to Obliging the Government to Provide Comprehensive Support to the Oppressed Palestinian People has 6 articles as follows:

 Article 1

The government is obliged to use all regional and international capacities to transfer the humanitarian aid of the Iranian peoples to the oppressed Palestinian people, especially in the occupied territories and the besieged land of Gaza. Support and defense of the Palestinian cause and the Palestinian fighters and refugees and the Palestinian Islamic Resistance must continue as much as possible until they achieve their rights.

 Article 2

By adopting active diplomacy and benefiting from capacities such as the Organisation of the Islamic Conference and the Organization of the Non-Aligned Movement, the Ministry of Foreign Affairs is obliged to create the necessary convergence to put pressure on the Zionist regime to stop its crimes in Gaza.

 Article 3

According to the rules of international law, crimes committed in Gaza are clear examples of crimes against humanity and genocide. The government has a duty to pursue the trial of the leaders of the occupying Zionist regime of Jerusalem in the International Criminal Court (ICC) and the domestic courts as criminals against humanity and perpetrators of genocide through international bodies, including the United Nations Security Council.

 Article 4

By mobilizing their resources and coordinating with the independent international media and the media of the Islamic world, the Islamic Republic of Iran Broadcasting and the Ministry of Culture and Islamic Guidance are obliged to convey to the world the oppression of the Palestinian people, especially about the oppressed people in the Gaza Strip, and the brutal and inhumane crimes of the Zionist regime.

 Article 5

The government is obliged to take the necessary measures to blockage the import of goods and to prevent the conclusion of contracts with companies whose main shareholders are Zionist enterprises.

 Article 6

The Ministry of Foreign Affairs is obliged to submit a report on the implementation of the Act to the National Security and Foreign Policy Commission of the Islamic Consultative Assembly once every two weeks.

See also 
 The Act to confronting the hostile actions of the Zionist regime against peace and security
 Protection of the Islamic Revolution of the Palestinian People Act
 Law on confrontation with human-rights violations and USA adventuresome and terrorist measures in the region
 Iranian Government's Reciprocal and Proportional Action in Implementing the JCPOA Act
 Specialized Commissions of the Parliament of Iran

References

External links 
 Juan Manuel Santos: Don’t forget Palestine
  A Threshold Crossed: Israeli Authorities and the Crimes of Apartheid and Persecution
 Iran’s support for Palestine to continue until liberation of holy Quds: Parliament speaker
 Iran always a supporter of oppressed Palestinian people

Law of Iran
Government of Iran
Modern history of Iran
Anti-Zionism
Israel and apartheid